Zakk Tyler or Zakk (born Dominic Joseph Zaccagnini) is an American Multi-Media Manager, Sports, News and Talk Show Personality.

Radio career
Upon graduation from Indiana University of Pennsylvania (1990) he began his career in Pittsburgh, Pennsylvania (WRRK) and later in Louisville, Kentucky (WTFX-FM), Memphis, Tennessee (WMFS) and then in Greenville, South Carolina (WTPT) as both the station program director and morning show host.  

The show moved to San Francisco to rock radio network (KSJO) that was broadcast to San Jose-Monterey-Contra Costa, California and distributed to company owned stations in Nashville, Tennessee and Greenville.  

In Chicago the show aired afternoon drive on WLUP. Zakk hosted NFL Chicago Bears pregame show and was frequent guest on sports television show Sports Page. 

The Zakk Tyler Show aired morning drivetime at WZGC (also known as "Dave-FM") in Atlanta, where Zakk was pregame and postgame host for Atlanta Falcons which aired on over 30 stations throughout the Southeast and Midwest.

Zakk (Dominic Zaccagnini) hosted a nationally syndicated sports show with former NFL quarterback Jack Trudeau (Zakk and Jack) weekday mornings from 2010 to 2012 that was carried throughout the Fox Sports Radio Network. 

In 2012, Zakk returned to WLUP in Chicago as an on-air personality and sports director for Merlin Media who would later sell the radio station to Cumulus Media who promoted Zakk to Program Director, Afternoon Drive at KSAN in 
San Francisco postgame host for San Francisco 49ers and pregame host for Kansas City Chiefs on KCFX-FM

Acting
Zakk appeared as himself in the Black Sabbath documentary We Sold Our Soul for Rock ‘n Roll (2001). 

Zakk was a consultant for episode 204 of the VH-1 sitcom Free Radio (2009) as storylines were based on his past radio experiences.

Current roles
Program Director, Talk Show Host, News and Sports for WHAM and WAIO in Rochester and WSYR in Syracuse

Radio awards
2004 Best Rock Radio Personality (Radio & Records)
2000, 1998, 1997 Best Local Radio Personality (Creative Loafing Magazine)
2003 Top 10 Radio Stunts of Year (Radio & Records Magazine)
1997 Program Director of the Year, runner-up (Billboard Magazine)
1997 Program Director of the Year for Active Rock, runner-up (FMQB Magazine)

Other notable recognition
 2013 Top 50 Singles in Chicago (Today's Chicago Woman Magazine)

External links
 
 
 
 

Radio personalities from Atlanta
Living people
1968 births